Marvel Two-in-One is an American comic book series published by Marvel Comics featuring Fantastic Four member the Thing in a different team-up each issue.

Publication history

Original series
The concept of teaming the Thing with a different character in each issue was given a test run in Marvel Feature #11-12 and proved a success. Marvel Two-in-One continued from the team-up stories in the final two issues of Marvel Feature and lasted for 100 issues from January 1974 through June 1983. Seven Annuals were also published. Artist Ron Wilson began his long association with the title with issue #12 (November 1975) and worked on it throughout its run. With issue #17, the series had a crossover with Marvel Team-Up #47, which featured Spider-Man. The second Marvel Two-in-One Annual was a crossover with Avengers Annual #7, both of which were written and drawn by Jim Starlin. The "Project Pegasus" storyline in Marvel Two-in-One #53-58 saw the introduction of the name "Quasar" for the Wendell Vaughn character and the transformation of Wundarr into the Aquarian.

Due to a binding error, three copies of issue 74 were released with the cover of DC's The New Teen Titans issue #6 in April 1981.

Comics creators who contributed to the series include Steve Gerber, Jack Kirby (who did pencils on several covers during its run), Marv Wolfman, John Buscema, John Byrne, Frank Miller, and George Pérez.

Marvel Two-In-One ended after 100 issues and seven Annuals. It was immediately replaced by a Thing solo series.

Revival
As part of Marvel Legacy, a soft relaunch of the Marvel Universe, Marvel Two-In-One (stylized as Marvel 2-in-One) was revived in December 2017 with a new story titled "The Fate of the Four" that revolves around the Thing and the Human Torch going on a road trip to investigate the disappearance of Reed Richards, Sue Storm, Franklin, and Valeria Richards. The series was written by Chip Zdarsky and ran for 12 issues and one Annual. The series was penciled by Jim Cheung (issues #1, 2, and 6), Valerio Schiti (issues #3–5), Ramon K. Perez (issues #7–12), and Declan Shalvey (Annual #1).

The issues

Annuals

Collected editions

Original series
 Marvel Two-In-One was first collected in its entirety, although in black-and-white, as four volumes of the Essential Marvel paperback reprint line.

 The series is currently being collected through the Marvel Masterworks line.

 The series is currently being collected in its entirety, in color, through Marvel's Epic Collection paperback reprint line.

 Three specific arcs have also been released as deluxe hardcovers through the Marvel Premiere Classics reprint line.

Revival series
 The revival series has been released as two trade paperbacks, collecting the entire series.

Notes

References

External links
Marvel Two-in-One at the Unofficial Handbook of Marvel Comics Creators
Marvel Two-in-One fan site

1974 comics debuts
1983 comics endings
2018 comics debuts
2019 comics endings
Comics by Chris Claremont
Comics by John Byrne (comics)
Comics by George Pérez
Comics by Marv Wolfman
Comics by Roy Thomas
Comics by Steve Gerber
Fantastic Four titles
Marvel Comics titles
Team-up comics